Club Ciclista Olímpico La Banda, also known as simply Ciclista Olímpico, is an Argentine sports club based in La Banda, Santiago del Estero. The club is mostly known for its basketball team, which currently plays in the Liga Nacional de Básquet (LNB), the top division of the Argentine league system.

Other sports practised at the club are field hockey, women's football, rugby union, swimming, tennis and volleyball.

History
Ciclista Olímpico ("Olympic Bicycle racer" in English) was founded on December 9, 1921, first with bicycle racing as the main activity such as its name indicated. Soon, the club incorporated basketball as a new activity, being the first club in Santiago del Estero where members could play that sport.

Current roster

Notable players
To appear in this section a player must have either:
- Set a club record or won an individual award as a professional player.
- Played at least one official international match for his senior national team at any time.

Head coaches
  Fernando Duró
  Adrian Capelli

References

External links
 

Basketball teams in Argentina
Basketball teams established in 1921
Argentine rugby union teams
Rugby clubs established in 1921
Argentine field hockey clubs
Sports teams in Santiago del Estero Province